Bluegrass Album, Vol. 6 – Bluegrass Instrumentals is the sixth and final album by bluegrass supergroup, Bluegrass Album Band, released in 1996. Violinist Bobby Hicks and bassist Todd Philips reunites with the group, while Vassar Clements remains in the lineup for this ultimate recording to produce a fantastic double-fiddle sound together with Hicks.

Most of the songs are classics by Bill Monroe, two are delivered by band's mandolinist, Doyle Lawson.

Track listing 
 "Wheel Hoss" (Bill Monroe) – 2:38
 "Misty Morning" (Doyle Lawson) – 3:43
 "Ground Speed" (Earl Scruggs) – 2:12
 "Stoney Lonesome" (Bill Monroe) – 2:32
 "Lonesome Moonlight Waltz" (Bill Monroe) – 3:52
 "Brown Country Breakdown" (Bill Monroe) – 2:42
 "Tall Timber" (Bill Monroe) – 2:15
 "North Country Waltz" (Doyle Lawson) – 3:49
 "Foggy Mountain Chimes" (Earl Scruggs) – 2:57
 "Monroe's Hornpipe" (Bill Monroe) – 2:47
 "Home Sweet Home" (Traditional) – 3:26
 "Roanoke" (Joe Ahr) – 2:13

Personnel 
 Tony Rice - guitar
 J.D. Crowe - banjo
 Doyle Lawson - mandolin
 Vassar Clements - fiddle
 Bobby Hicks - fiddle
 Jerry Douglas - Dobro
 Todd Philips - bass

References 

1996 albums
Rounder Records albums